Tropical Storm Tammy was a short-lived tropical storm during October in the 2005 Atlantic hurricane season which caused minor damage to the southeastern United States. More significant, however, were its remnants, which contributed to the Northeast U.S. flooding of October 2005.

Tropical Storm Tammy formed from a non-tropical system off the Florida coast on October 5. It moved north just offshore before making landfall later that day. The tropical storm rapidly weakened as it moved overland and dissipated the next day. Its remnant circulation moved south towards the Gulf of Mexico, while the moisture was absorbed by a northeasterly moving cold front. There were no fatalities directly related to Tammy; however, ten people were killed by the remnants of the storm in combination with the remnants of Subtropical Depression Twenty-Two. Total damages from the storm were $30 million.

Meteorological history

A tropical wave left the western coast of Africa on September 24 and crossed the Atlantic without any development. The wave began to develop on October 2 north of the Lesser Antilles when it encountered an upper-level trough. It strengthened as it passed through the Bahamas and early on October 5 a vigorous tropical disturbance formed. As the system already had tropical-storm force winds, it was immediately named Tropical Storm Tammy. Upon being classified, the system was poorly organized, with deep convection only persisting to the northeast of the center of circulation. Tammy quickly tracked towards the northwest in a southerly flow between a mid to upper-level low over the Gulf of Mexico and a ridge located over the western Atlantic Ocean. At 6:30 pm EST (2300 UTC), the storm made landfall with winds of  near Atlantic Beach, Florida. The tropical storm then moved inland over Georgia and into southeastern Alabama near Ozark, where it lost its circulation on October 6.

The remnant low drifted south towards the Gulf of Mexico before being absorbed by a cold front (which also picked remnants of Subtropical Depression Twenty-two), and moving northeast. This cold front, of which Tammy's remnants were a part, affected much of the Northeastern United States over the next few days.

Preparations

Tropical Storm Tammy surprised forecasters when it formed on October 5. Because they had not expected the disturbance to develop, warnings were not issued until about 12 hours before the storm made landfall. Despite the short warning, tourists and business travelers cancelled flights as the storm neared landfall. Upon the storm developing, a tropical storm warning was immediately issued for the coast from Cocoa Beach, Florida to the Santee River, South Carolina.

The U.S. Department of Homeland Security's U.S. Coast Guard, 7th District issued an advisory to mariners, warning them to prepare for the storm and avoid the ocean if possible. In Georgia, the National Park Service evacuated the residents of Cumberland Island and closed the ferry which services it. The Glynn County Emergency Operations Agency monitored and prepared for Tropical Storm Tammy's landfall, however the poor warning hampered their efforts. Residents all over the state expressed frustration at the lack of time they had to prepare. When Tammy moved inland 12 hours later the southern end of the warning zone moved north to Altamaha Sound, Georgia before all warnings were discontinued on October 6.

Impact

Tropical Storm Tammy caused minor damage. The winds produced no significant damage, but did disrupt power to 16,500 utility customers and delayed the Trysail College Regatta. Lightning produced by a thunderstorm in Broward County, Florida struck three teenagers during a football game in Coconut Creek, killing one and injuring the other two.

To most areas in north Florida and southern Georgia, Tammy brought  of rain, though some isolated areas received . In Georgia, flooding damaged over 30 homes in Brunswick. Several dirt and coastal roads were washed out, and sewers overflowed as far north as Baltimore County, Maryland. Two small pond dams burst, including a 173-year-old wooden dam, but new stone dams were constructed in place before the old ones failed. Conversely, Tammy's rains were beneficial in South Carolina, where they helped alleviate dry conditions after a rainless September.

In addition to the flooding, Tropical Storm Tammy spawned one tornado. Rated an F0 tornado, it touched down near Brunswick, Georgia where it snapped trees and caused moderate roof damage along its  path. The storm's total damage was estimated at $30 million (2005 USD). The worst damage occurred in Beaufort County where 30 trees were downed, one of which fell on a home. Rough seas undermined several beach homes and caused one to be condemned. Casualties in New England included seven people in New Hampshire and three people in Connecticut.

Aftermath and records
A Red Cross shelter at Seldon Park, Brunswick, Georgia, opened for two days following the storm to temporarily house those whose houses were flooded. Tammy's remnant low was absorbed a larger extratropical low which tracked north and contributed to the Northeast U.S. flooding of October 2005, which killed ten people and caused significant damage. As a result of the flooding, the Federal Emergency Management Agency paid $44 million in losses.

Shrimpers in the Carolinas blamed high fuel prices and the disruption of Tropical Storm Tammy for some of the troubles facing the shrimping industry in 2005. Rising fuel prices and dwindling demand has already created tough conditions that year, but the disruption of several days' fishing due to Tammy escalated the situation.

When Tammy formed on October 5, it became the earliest in the season that the twentieth storm formed, a distinction it held until 2020, when Tropical Storm Vicky formed on September 14.

See also

 Northeast U.S. flooding of October 2005
 List of Florida hurricanes (2000–present)
 Timeline of the 2005 Atlantic hurricane season
 Tropical Storm Julia (2016)

References

External links

  (PDF)
 NHC's archive on Tropical Storm Tammy
 Hydrometeorological Prediction Center's archive on Tropical Storm Tammy

2005 Atlantic hurricane season
Atlantic tropical storms
Hurricanes in Florida
Hurricanes in Georgia (U.S. state)
Tammy